Conan IV ( 1138 – 20 February 1171), called the Young, was the Duke of Brittany from 1156 to 1166. He was the son of Bertha, Duchess of Brittany, and her first husband, Alan, Earl of Richmond. Conan IV was his father's heir as Earl of Richmond and his mother's heir as Duke of Brittany. Conan and his daughter Constance would be the only representatives of the House of Penthièvre to rule Brittany.

Accession
Conan was the son of Duchess Bertha by her first husband, Alan, 1st Earl of Richmond. With the death of his mother in early 1156, Conan IV expected to inherit the ducal throne. However, he was denied his inheritance by his stepfather, Odo II, Viscount of Porhoët, who refused to relinquish authority. Odo may have entered into a pact with Conan's maternal uncle, Hoel, Count of Nantes, with the goal of dividing Brittany between them. Being under threat of rebellion in Nantes, sponsored by Geoffrey VI, Count of Anjou, Hoel could not send Odo any aid. Within the year Conan IV was able to capture and imprison Odo and claim his inheritance.

Conan also inherited the title Earl of Richmond from his father Alan, which made him subject to both the King of England and the King of France.

Plantagenet ambitions 

Henry II of England, the Count of Anjou, attempted to obtain control of the Duchy of Brittany, which neighboured his lands and had traditionally been largely independent from the rest of France, with its own language and culture. The Breton dukes held little power across most of the duchy, which was mostly controlled by local lords. In 1148, Duke Conan III died and civil war broke out. Henry claimed to be the overlord of Brittany, on the basis that the duchy had owed loyalty to Henry I, and saw controlling the duchy both as a way of securing his other French territories and as a potential inheritance for one of his sons. Initially Henry's strategy was to rule indirectly through proxies, and accordingly Henry supported Conan IV's claims over most of the duchy, partly because Conan had strong English ties and could be easily influenced. Conan's uncle, Hoel, continued to control the county of Nantes in the east until he was deposed in 1156 by Henry's brother, Geoffrey, possibly with Henry's support.

When Geoffrey of Anjou died in 1158, Conan attempted to reclaim Nantes but was opposed by Henry who annexed it for himself. Louis took no action to intervene as Henry steadily increased his power in Brittany. Conan's control of Nantes had the effect of reuniting Brittany. Henry II, responded by seizing the Earldom of Richmond, Conan's paternal inheritance, and demanded the return of Nantes. Conan and Henry made peace, and in 1160 Conan married Henry's cousin Margaret, sister of the Scottish king William the Lion. Conan and Margaret had at least one daughter, Constance. A son of Conan's named William appears to have still been alive towards 1200.

Unrest and abdication 

Conan faced several revolts from his own nobles, rebellions possibly covertly supported by England. To put down the unrest, the Duke appealed for help to Henry II, who, in return, demanded the betrothal of Constance to Henry's younger son Geoffrey.

While local Breton nobles began to rebel against Conan IV, Henry had begun to alter his policy of indirect rule in Brittany and started to exert more direct control. In 1164 Henry intervened to seize lands along the border of Brittany and Normandy, and in 1166 invaded Brittany to punish the local barons. Henry then forced Conan to abdicate as duke and to give Brittany to his daughter Constance; Conan also betrothed Constance to Henry's son Geoffrey. This arrangement was quite unusual in terms of medieval law, as Conan might have had sons who could have legitimately inherited the duchy.

According to the histories that record the abdication of Conan IV, he died in 1171 sometime after his abdication.

Henry II had claimed to be Overlord of Brittany, as would his son Richard the Lionheart. Henry never claimed the Dukedom of Brittany. After Conan IV abdicated, Henry II held guardianship over Brittany for Conan's daughter Constance, until such time as Henry II's fourth legitimate son, Geoffrey Plantagenet, could marry her.

Portrayals in literature 
Conan is usually remembered in Breton historiography as a weak ruler, unable to protect his duchy against the powerful Angevin king, although historian Eric Borgnis-Desbordes has recently qualified this opinion.

Conan IV is mentioned in the tragedy Jean sans Terre ou la mort d'Arthur (1791) by Jean-François Ducis, the novels Time and Chance (2002), Prince of Darkness (2005) and Devil's Brood (2008) by Sharon Kay Penman, and the second volume of the trilogy Le Château des Poulfenc (2009) by Brigitte Coppin.

See also
 List of rulers of Brittany

Notes

References

References

External links

|-

1130s births
1171 deaths
12th-century dukes of Brittany
12th-century English nobility
Dukes of Brittany
Earls of Richmond (1136 creation)